English Caye Light is an active lighthouse on a small island in Belize. The white lantern is mounted on a 19m high framework tower, and also has a focal plane of 19 m (62 ft).

See also
 List of lighthouses in Belize

References

External links
 Belize Port Authority

Lighthouses in Belize
Belize District
Belize Rural South